The 12-inch coast defense mortar was a weapon of  caliber emplaced during the 1890s and early 20th century to defend US harbors from seaborne attack. In 1886, when the Endicott Board set forth its initial plan for upgrading the coast defenses of the United States, it relied primarily on mortars, not guns, to defend American harbors.  Over the years, provision was made for fortifications that would mount some 476 of these weapons, although not all of these tubes were installed. Ninety-one of these weapons were remounted as railway artillery in 1918-1919, but this was too late to see action in World War I. The railway mortars were only deployed in small quantities, and none overseas. The fixed mortars in the Philippines saw action in the Japanese invasion in World War II. All of the fixed mortars (except four) in the United States were scrapped by 1944, as new weapons replaced them, and the railway mortars were scrapped after the war. Today, the only remaining mortars of this type in the 50 states are four at Battery Laidley, part of Fort Desoto near St. Petersburg, Florida, but the remains of coast defense mortar emplacements can be seen at many former Coast Artillery forts across the United States and its former territories. Additional 12-inch mortars and other large-caliber weapons remain in the Philippines.

The weapons

The M1890M1 (Model of 1890, Modification 1) 12-inch mortar was one of the most powerful coast artillery pieces of its era, and was the most common type emplaced to guard U.S. harbors.

This mortar and other models, the M1886, M1908, and M1912, usually fired deck-piercing (also called armor-piercing) shells.

The deck-piercing shells were usually the ammunition of choice, because even the heaviest battleships of the 1890-1920 period were relatively lightly armored on the tops of their main decks, so a plunging half-ton shell could inflict crippling damage on one of them. Early on (from about 1890 to 1915), coast defense mortars were also supplied with so-called "torpedo shells" weighing  (see illustration at right, below).

The M1890M1 mortar was most often installed on an M1896 carriage, which weighed 128,000 pounds; the mortar and its carriage weighed a total of 78.5 tons. The carriage was geared to enable it to be turned (in azimuth) by means of a traversing crank with two handles, located on the right side of the piece. A ring marked in degrees of azimuth ran around the mortar, just outside the inner steel circle or "racer" that carried the carriage, and a soldier read a pointer on the racer to aim the mortar in direction. The tube was raised or lowered (in elevation) by twin geared wheels with long spokes (resembling ship's wheels) that were located on either side of the carriage. The breech could be rapidly depressed to an almost level position for loading and then be quickly elevated for firing. Other carriages included the M1891 and M1908.

In addition to the elevation of its tube, the factor that determined the mortar's range was the size of the powder charge that was loaded into its breech, following the shell. The desired range for the mortar was specified in terms of zones. The smallest zone (shortest range) was Zone 1, and the largest (longest range) was Zone 9. Often the base bag was painted red, indicating that the powder assembly was to be loaded into the breech "red end last," so that it bumped up against the closing breech block (or faced the gunner). The red base bag also contained a small charge of black powder as an igniter. When the breech was closed, a detonator was inserted through the breech block and contacted the igniter, ready to set off the full powder charge.

The mortar could be fired in one of two ways: either electrically or manually (by the pull of a lanyard). And each method had its own type of detonator (electrical or friction). Electrical firing required first that the crew attach a wire to the electrical detonator, which protruded from the breech block. Second, the crew had to connect the firing cable coming out of the pit floor to the carriage of the individual mortar, out in the pit. Third, the circuit switch (usually located on the wall of the pit near the data booth) leading to the individual mortar had to be thrown into the closed (firing) position. Finally, the firing magneto, which was mounted on a special "shoe", often on the wall of the pit near the data booth, had to be cranked up and then released, sending the firing current out to the pit. Depending on the switch settings, the mortars in a given pit could be fired one at a time or all together. Lanyard firing had fewer fail-safe features, and was accomplished by a crewman who stood well behind the breech and pulled smartly on the lanyard to fire the individual mortar.

Emplacement design history 

The earliest coast defense mortar batteries of the modern era were designed as so-called "Abbot Quads". Named for Gen. Henry Larcom Abbot, the Army engineer who invented the design, Abbot Quads were rectangular configurations of four rectangular mortar pits with four mortars per pit. Often these early pits had rounded corners and one open side which backed up to a magazine corridor or an open concrete pad, while the front side of the pit was protected by a high earthen bank or berm, making the pit invisible to attackers and almost impossible to hit from the sea. A plan for an Abbot Quad mortar battery is shown at left. The earthen prototype for these was built in the 1870s at Fort Totten in New York City, and construction of the first operational Abbot Quads commenced circa 1892.

The idea behind the Abbot Quad was to have all 16 mortars in the four pits fire at once, producing a shotgun-like salvo of plunging shells optimally dispersed to destroy an enemy ship. It was argued that targeting each mortar individually would not produce many more hits than salvo firing, since early fire control procedures and equipment were often error-prone. Furthermore, proponents of salvo firing pointed out that it made for easier command and control (particularly under battle conditions), since all mortars in all pits of a battery could be given the same firing data. Early battery designs often contained one central "firing room" from which cables ran out to the various mortar pits, enabling electrical firing of all weapons simultaneously. It is not clear, however, if this method of simultaneous firing for multiple pits (or even for four mortars in one pit) was ever put into practice.

However, the early Abbot Quad designs featured very small mortar pits. A photo of such an early "crowded pit" is shown at left.

When a mortar battery was fully manned, formal guidelines called for a pit containing just two mortars (see photo at right) to be manned by a pit commander, two mortar squads of 17 enlisted men each, and an ammunition squad of 16 enlisted men. One of the last (1942) versions of the manual for the 12-inch mortar gives details on how it was to be crewed and fired.

After about 1905, reliance on the Abbot Quad design declined. Some artillery officers argued that salvo firing was inherently wasteful, and that a much better hit ratio could be achieved by aiming each mortar individually against a specified target. They also argued that the smaller, cramped mortar pits of the early Abbot Quad battery designs were simply too crowded for efficient operations, with mortar crews for different tubes constantly getting in each other's way.

As fire control methods improved and the network of base end stations for the Coast Artillery fire control system was extended, from about 1905 on, individual aiming of mortars could be more accurate. At the same time, designs for new pits often specified only two mortars per pit, and newer forts had side-by-side, open-back mortar pits. Experience showed the time to reload four tightly-packed mortars in a pit was more than twice the time to reload two mortars in a pit. As a result, many 4-mortar pits were "depopulated," and some of their tubes were sent away to equip newer batteries.

Firing the mortars
This film clip that dates from around 1915 shows a firing drill on the 12-inch mortars of Battery Howe, part of the Harbor Defenses of San Francisco. Although the battery shown is a linear one, the firing drill is similar to what would have taken place in a square or rectangular pit at Fort Banks. The film clip illustrates how congested one of the old-style pits would have become if used to fire four mortars simultaneously or nearly so.

The film shows the heavy shells (on shell carts) being wheeled up to the breeches of the mortars and rammed home, the powder bags being tossed into the breeches after them, the crew clearing the immediate area while the chief of the breech raises his arm to indicate "ready to fire," and the mortars being fired electrically (from outside the area pictured). The tubes are then depressed, crewmen rush back in to swab out the tubes and the process repeats.

The shock wave from firing just one of these huge mortars, particularly if it was fired within one of the smaller, old-style pits, was often so strong that it destroyed sensitive equipment mounted near the pit, knocked doors off nearby magazines and barracks, and broke windows in nearby neighborhoods. The thundering crash of four of these mortars being fired simultaneously in a pit must have been overwhelming.

Fire control

The images here show another feature of the mortar pits—the data booth, part of the Coast Artillery fire control system. Personnel in this small space, with its tapered viewing slits, received the coordinates (azimuth and elevation) that had been calculated via plotting board by the battery's Range Unit as the firing coordinates for the mortars in order for them to hit their targets.

The reconstructed data board in the photo at left hangs off the side of the data booth and is used to post the firing coordinates for mortars #3 and #4 in its pit (evidently the only two mortars there). The "Zone" number posted on the board refers to the size of the powder charge to be loaded for the coming shot. The top photo at right shows a decomposed set of slats (which likely used to have slates attached to them) that could have firing data chalked onto them and then be slid out of the data booth so they could be seen by the mortar crews in the pit.

Since crews of the mortars could not see their targets, they were especially dependent on the overall fire control system, with its base end stations and plotting room, to locate and pinpoint targets for them to hit.

Railway mortars

After the American entry into World War I on 6 April 1917, the US Army considered converting coast artillery weapons to railway mounts for use on the Western Front. Railway guns were in use by all the major belligerents in the war by that time. Among the weapons that could be spared from fixed defenses were 150 12-inch mortars, removed from 4-mortar pits. Contracts were let for mounting 91 mortars on railway carriages known as the M1918 Carriage (Railway). A hydro-pneumatic recuperator and outriggers allowed for all-around fire from the railway mounting, which weighed 88 tons. Forty-five railway mortar carriages were completed by the Morgan Engineering Company of Alliance, Ohio by 7 April 1919. All 91 contracted mortars were eventually mounted; one source states that all of these were the M1890. The following footnoted article shows the firing of an M1890 mortar on a railway mounting. Since the mounting permitted all-around fire and thus tracking of a moving target, the 12-inch railway mortar (along with 8-inch guns and twelve 7-inch guns on similar carriages) was retained after World War I for future coast defense use. The Army conducted tests with railway mortars in the 1930s. Some (probably four) of the railway mortars were assigned to Battery C, 52nd Railway Artillery Battalion, and tested at the Sandy Hook Proving Ground at Fort Hancock, New Jersey and also at Fort Miles, Delaware. During World War II, a battery of four railway mortars was among the temporary harbor defenses of Grays Harbor, Washington, and emplacements for an additional battery at Cape George, Washington were constructed but never armed.

Combat service
Probably the only US 12-inch mortars to see action were those in the Philippines in 1942, particularly Battery Way and Battery Geary at Fort Mills on Corregidor. These batteries totaled twelve mortars and were used in the fight against the Japanese invasion. However, as with other US pre-1940 fortifications (most of which were designed well before the airplane was invented), the open-top emplacement design left the mortars open to air and high-angle artillery attack. All but two of the batteries' mortars were knocked out by the latter, all but one of Battery Geary's by a single hit that penetrated the magazine. The mortar batteries had mostly armor-piercing ammunition which would penetrate into the ground before exploding, and therefore was less effective than high explosive ammunition against ground forces. Other 12-inch mortars were Battery Koehler on Carabao Island (Fort Frank), which was used for ineffectual counter-battery fire against the Japanese Kondo Detachment artillery on the southern shore of Manila Bay, and Battery Craighill on Caballo Island (Fort Hughes), which fired at targets generated locally and from Corregidor.  Battery Craighill was manned by naval personnel from the gunboat Mindanao. All forts were surrendered on 6 May 1942 along with Corregidor. Ten mortars remain at Batteries Way and Geary while four mortars remain at Fort Hughes as of 2014.

In the desperate defense of Corregidor an attempt was made to use these mortars as antiaircraft weapons. Three types of fuzes were tried: powder train and mechanical time fuzes for 3-inch AA guns, and a shrapnel fuze for 155 mm GPF field guns. None of these resulted in detonation of the mortar shell. The leading theories were that either the low rotational velocity of the shell or the small booster charge in the fuzes precluded detonation.

Surviving examples
Nineteen 12-inch mortars survive, mostly in the Philippines, with four at Fort DeSoto on Mullet Key near St. Petersburg, Florida.
 4 mortars M1890MI (Watervliet #173, 174, 170, 172) on M1896MI carriages (Watertown #158, 151, 241, 150) at Battery Way, Fort Mills, Corregidor, Philippines
 2 mortars M1890MI (Bethlehem #31, 40) on M1896MI carriages (Unk. mfr., #104, 210) at Battery Geary Pit A, Fort Mills, Corregidor, Philippines
 4 mortars M1908 (Watervliet #2, 22, 13, 12) on M1908 carriages (Unk. mfr., #17, 20, 19, 18) at Battery Geary Pit B, Fort Mills, Corregidor, Philippines
 4 mortars M1912 (Watervliet #40, 39, 41, 38) on M1896MIII carriages (Watertown #41, 40, 38, 39) at Battery Craighill Pits A and B, Fort Hughes, Caballo Island, Philippines
 4 mortars M1890MI (Watervliet #22, 86, 132, 135) on M1896MI carriages (American Hoist #183, 184, 185, 187) at Battery Laidley Pits A and B, Fort DeSoto, Mullet Key, Florida
 1 mortar M1911, (Unk. mfr., #8) without carriage (non-standard training dummy) at the visitor center, Fort Wadsworth, Staten Island, New York

See also

 Battery Way
 Seacoast defense in the United States
 List of heavy mortars
 List of U.S. Army weapons by supply catalog designation SNL E-13

Notes

References

Further reading
 Berhow, Mark A. and McGovern, Terrance C. American Defenses of Corregidor and Manila Bay 1898–1945, Osprey Publishing Ltd.; 1st edition, 2003.

External links

FortWiki gun type list
 Technical Manual for 12-inch Seacoast Materiel

World War I artillery of the United States
Mortars of the United States
World War II artillery of the United States
Coastal artillery
Railway guns
305 mm artillery